Trương Công Thảo (born 11 October 1988) is a Vietnamese footballer who plays as a striker for V.League 2 club Phù Đổng.

References

1988 births
Living people
Vietnamese footballers
Vissai Ninh Bình FC players
Can Tho FC players
Saigon FC players
Khanh Hoa FC players
Association football forwards